Harris Creek is a  long 2nd order tributary to the Valley River in Cherokee County, North Carolina.

Course
Harris Creek rises on the Junaluska Creek divide in Cherokee County and flows northwest to join Valley River about 0.25 miles southwest of Rhodo, North Carolina.

Watershed
Harris Creek drains  of area, receives about 68.6 in/year of precipitation, and has a wetness index of 217.91 and is about 91% forested.

References

Rivers of North Carolina
Tributaries of the Hiwassee River
Bodies of water of Cherokee County, North Carolina